Paulo Vitor Fernandes Pereira (born 24 June 1999), known as Paulo Vitor, is a Brazilian footballer who plays as a forward for Portuguese club Rio Ave, on loan from Spanish club Real Valladolid.

Club career
Born in Rio de Janeiro, Paulo Vitor graduated from Vasco da Gama's youth setup. He scored his first goal as professional on 12 July 2017, in the match against Vitória.

On 28 August 2018, Paulo Vitor joined Spanish Segunda División side Albacete Balompié on loan for one year, with a buyout clause. The following 30 January, after being rarely used, he moved to Marbella FC in Segunda División B on loan until June.

On 2 October 2020, Paulo Vitor moved to Real Valladolid and was assigned to the reserves in the third division. He renewed his contract until 2025 on 12 January 2022, and was loaned to Portuguese Primeira Liga side Rio Ave F.C. on 16 July, with a buyout clause.

References

External links
 
 

1999 births
Living people
Footballers from Rio de Janeiro (city)
Brazilian footballers
Association football forwards
Campeonato Brasileiro Série A players
CR Vasco da Gama players
Segunda División players
Primera Federación players
Segunda División B players
Albacete Balompié players
Marbella FC players
Real Valladolid Promesas players
Rio Ave F.C. players
Brazilian expatriate footballers
Brazilian expatriate sportspeople in Spain
Brazilian expatriate sportspeople in Portugal
Expatriate footballers in Spain
Expatriate footballers in Portugal